Galium elongatum (marsh bedstraw or tall bedstraw) is a species of plants in the  Rubiaceae. It is widespread across most of Europe, North Africa and the Middle East from Turkey to Palestine to Iran.

Galium elongatum is a tall, erect herb with panicles of small white flowers.

References

External links
Tela Botanica, Gaillet allongé
Botanik im Bild, /  Flora von Österreich, Liechtenstein und Südtirol, Lang-Sumpf-Labkraut  /  Verlängertes (Sumpf-)Labkraut
Wilde Planten in Nederland en Belgie, Moeraswalstro, Tongblier, Marsh Bedstraw, Gaillet des marais, Sumpf-Labkraut
Acta Plantarum, IPFI Indice dei nomi delle specie botaniche presenti in Italia 
Latvijas Daba, pagarinātā madara (Galium elongatum C.Presl)

elongatum
Flora of Europe
Flora of North Africa
Flora of Western Asia
Flora of Algeria
Flora of Germany
Flora of Great Britain
Flora of Greece
Flora of Hungary
Flora of Iran
Flora of Italy
Flora of Morocco
Flora of Poland
Flora of Portugal
Flora of Spain
Flora of Sweden
Flora of Switzerland
Flora of the Canary Islands
Plants described in 1822
Taxa named by Carl Borivoj Presl